Fatao is an urban commune and small town in the Cercle of Diéma in the Kayes Region of western Mali. In the 2009 census the commune had a population of 9,239.

References

External links
.

Communes of Kayes Region